After Many Years is a 1908 American silent drama film directed by  D. W. Griffith. Prints of the film exist in the Library of Congress film archive. The film is an adaptation of Enoch Arden.

Plot
The short film is about a love triangle, in which a young lady discovers that she is in love with her boyfriend's best friend after her sweetheart dies at sea.

Cast
 Charles Inslee as John Davis
 Florence Lawrence as Mrs. John Davis
 Harry Solter as Tom Foster
 Gladys Egan as The Davis' daughter
 Linda Arvidson
 Edward Dillon
 George Gebhardt as A sailor
 Arthur V. Johnson as Member of the rescue party
 Herbert Prior
 Mack Sennett as Sailor/Member of the rescue party

See also
 1908 in film
 D. W. Griffith filmography

References

External links

1908 films
1908 drama films
1908 short films
Films based on Enoch Arden
Films directed by D. W. Griffith
Silent American drama films
American silent short films
American black-and-white films
Films shot in New Jersey
Films with screenplays by Frank E. Woods
1900s American films